Charles-Alexandre (Alexandre-Charles) Fessy (October 18, 1804November 30, 1856) was a French organist and composer. He entered the Paris Conservatory in 1813 studying harmony and piano. He later joined the organ class of Benoist and won first prize in organ in 1826. He was organist of the small organ in l'Assomption before becoming the first organist of la Madeleine in 1846. The following year he exchanged position with Lefébure-Wély the organist of Saint-Roch. Fessy stayed at Saint-Roch until his death in 1856. Apart from being an organist he also served as the conductor of the 5th Legion of the National Guard in Paris.

Works
Pièces pour orgue (Éditions Musicales Chanvrelin 1995)
Offertoire
Choeur de Clairon
Grand Choeur
Les Jeux de Fonds
Fugue
Boléro

Scores

For listening 
 at the Rieger-Kloss organ in St-Nicolas church, Tallinn, Estonia.

References

1804 births
1856 deaths
French classical organists
French male organists
19th-century classical musicians
19th-century French male musicians
Male classical organists
19th-century organists